Gazelle ankles (transliterated from Arabic: كعب الغزال kaʕbu lɣazaːl, also known in French as cornes de gazelle, "gazelle horns") are a traditional cookie of North Africa. They are crescent-shaped cookies made of flour-based dough filled with almond paste aromatized with orange blossom water. Gazelle ankles are relatively pricey due to the use of almonds as an ingredient, and are therefore served as a delicacy at special events such as weddings and baby showers, often with tea.

Ingredients 
The essential ingredients in gazelle ankles:

 almonds
 orange blossom water
 flour
 sugar
 butter
 cinnamon

References 

Algerian cuisine
Moroccan pastry
Tunisian cuisine